Azov-Don Bank was one of the largest -stock commercial banks in the Russian Empire. It was founded in 1871 in Taganrog located on the shores of the Sea of Azov. It became a major vehicle for French investment in the Russia Empire prior to the First World War. In 1905-6 French banks bought ten thousand shares in this bank. In 1912 The Azov-Don Bank invested in the French Banque des Pays du Nord, with Boris Kamenka being appointed to the latter's board.

The Bank was nationalized shortly after the October Revolution by a decree of the Council of People's Commissars of the Russian Soviet Federative Socialist Republic in December 1917.

References

Banks of the Russian Empire
1871 establishments in the Russian Empire